Johann Daniel Overbeck (23 June 1715, Rethem - 3 August 1802, in Lübeck) was an evangelical theologian and Rector at the Katharineum.

Biography 
He was the son of the Superintendent, . His parents could not afford the fees for all three sons to continue their education, so he was already working as a tutor while attending the Katharineum. In 1734, he began studying theology at the University of Helmstedt, where Johann Lorenz von Mosheim hired him as a private tutor to help defray his tuition. 

In 1753, he became the Konrektor there and, ten years later, succeeded  as Rector. He held that position until his retirement in 1795.

In 1754, he married Charlotte Chüden (1725-1802), second daughter of the Court Physician, Christian Friedrich Chüden (1686-1747). They had two daughters and a son, of which only the youngest daughter survived.

He never acknowledged the changes brought about by the Enlightenment, either personally or professionally, so the Katharineum's prestige had reached a low point by the end of the 18th century. He himself remained highly respected. The University of Kiel awarded him an honorary Doctorate in 1793. 

The poet and Bürgermeister of Lübeck, Christian Adolph Overbeck, was his nephew.

Sources 
 Christian Adolph Overbeck: Leben Herrn Johann Daniel Overbecks, weyland Doctors der Theologie und Rectors des Lübeckischen Gymnasiums. Von einem nahen Verwandten, und vormaligen Schüler des Verewigten. Lübeck: Römhild, 1803
 Alken Bruns: "Johann Daniel Overbeck". In: Lübecker Lebensläufe, Neumünster 1993, pp.290–292. 
 "Overbeck (Johann Daniel)" in: Johann Samuel Ersch, Johann Gottfried Gruber, Moritz Hermann Eduard Meier, Hermann Brockhaus, Johann Georg Heinrich Hassel, A. G. Müller, August Leskien, Allgemeine Encyclopädie der Wissenschaften und Künste, Vol.3, 1836, pp.32–36
  (Nebeneintrag im Artikel zu Christian Adolph Overbeck)
 Isabel Sellheim: "Die Familie des Malers Friedrich Overbeck (1789–1869) in genealogischen Übersichten". In: Deutsches Familienarchiv. Vol. 104, Neustadt an der Aisch 1989, GW

External links 

 

1715 births
1802 deaths
German theologians
German evangelicals
School administrators
People from Heidekreis